Anton Ferrer y Codina (Barcelona, 1837 - October 11, 1905) was a Spanish playwright and newspaper writer.

Biography 
Born in Barcelona in 1837, he was editor of the Barcelona Alegre and La Tomasa weeklies.  He died on October 11, 1905.

Major works 
 1867. Les relíquies d'una mare, premiered at the Teatro Romea, on 20 January 1867.
 1867. Un gefe de la coronela patriotic drama in three acts, premiered at the Teatro Romea, on 19 December 1867.
 1868. La perla de Badalona, premiered at the Teatro Romea, on 4 January 1868.
 1868. Ocells d'Amèrica, premiered at the Teatro Romea, on 3 February 1868.
 1868. El gat de mar, premiered at the Teatro Romea, on 21 November 1868.
 1902. Els calaveres, comedy in three acts, originally by A. Hennequin and E. de Najac, and adapted by Ferrer and Codina; premiered at the Teatro Romea.

Notes

References

External links 

1837 births
1905 deaths
Journalists from Catalonia
Catalan dramatists and playwrights